Malcolm Patterson may refer to:
 Malcolm R. Patterson (1861–1935), American politician and jurist
 Malcolm A. Patterson (1890–1965), lawyer and political figure in Nova Scotia